A courier is a person, company or vehicle that transports mail and small items.

Courier may also refer to:

Arts and entertainment
 The Couriers, a series of graphic novels
 The Courier, and Come Again Courier, two novels in the 1970s Tobin series by the British author Stanley Morgan
 The Courier, the player character in the video game Fallout: New Vegas
 Courier (Akudama Drive), a fictional character from the anime Akudama Drive
 Courier (album), 2002 album by Richard Shindell

Film and television

 Courier (film), a 1987 Soviet film directed by Karen Shakhnazarov
 The Courier (1988 film), a 1988 British thriller film
 The Courier (2012 film), a 2012 action film
 The Courier (2019 film), a 2019 American-British thriller film
 The Courier (2020 film), a 2020 spy film starring Benedict Cumberbatch 
 "The Courier" (The Blacklist), a 2013 episode of TV series The Blacklist

Periodicals

Australia
 The Courier (Ballarat), a daily regional newspaper published in Ballarat, Victoria
 The Courier-Mail, a daily regional newspaper published in Brisbane, Queensland
 The Courier (Hobart), a 19th-century newspaper published in Hobart, Tasmania
 The Courier (Mount Barker), an independent local newspaper published since 1880 in the Adelaide Hills town of Mount Barker
 The Courier (Narrabri), a regional newspaper published in Narrabri, New South Wales, Australia

Canada
 The Capilano Courier, a Canadian student newspaper published at Capilano College
 Vancouver Courier, a Canadian semi-weekly local newspaper

United Kingdom
 Courier (Quarterly), a magazine published in Britain during the period 1938–1951
 The Courier (Dundee) or The Courier & Advertiser, a broadsheet newspaper published in Dundee, Scotland
 The Courier (Newcastle University newspaper), a weekly student newspaper
 Leamington Courier, a newspaper in England
 Courier Journal (Oxfordshire), former name of the Oxford Journal
 South Oxfordshire Courier, a free newspaper, distributed throughout Southern Oxfordshire
 Tyrone Courier, a weekly newspaper based in Dungannon, County Tyrone, Northern Ireland

United States

 The Courier (magazine), a gaming magazine
 The News Courier, a daily newspaper published in Athens, Alabama
 The Daily Courier (Arizona), a newspaper for Yavapai County, Arizona
 Claremont Courier, a local newspaper published in Claremont, California
 The Courier (Norwich), a newspaper published in Norwich, Connecticut
 Champaign–Urbana Courier, called The Courier from 1971 to 1977, Illinois
 Lincoln Courier, a daily newspaper published in Lincoln, Illinois
 Ottumwa Courier, a newspaper published in Ottumwa, Iowa
 The Waterloo-Cedar Falls Courier, a daily newspaper published in Waterloo / Cedar Falls, Iowa
 The Courier-Journal, a newspaper in Louisville, Kentucky
 The Houma Courier, a daily newspaper published in Houma, Louisiana
 Boston Courier, a newspaper published in Boston, Massachusetts
 Charlevoix Courier, weekly newspaper of Charlevoix, Michigan
 Capital City Courier, a newspaper published between 1894 and 1903 in Lincoln, Nebraska
 Courier News, a daily newspaper published in Somerville, New Jersey
 The Courier (Findlay), a daily newspaper published in Findlay, Ohio
 Pittsburgh Courier, an newspaper published from 1907 to 1965 in Pittsburgh, Pennsylvania
 The Courier (Conroe newspaper), a newspaper published in Conroe, Texas (Houston area)
 Bristol Herald Courier, a daily newspaper in Bristol, Virginia

Other periodicals
 Courier (Israeli newspaper), a Russian-language Israeli newspaper published in Tel Aviv
 The Courier (ACP-EU), a magazine published by the Development Directorate General of the European Commission
 The Timaru Courier, an A3 tabloid community newspaper in the Timaru South Canterbury area of New Zealand
 CERN Courier, a trade magazine covering current developments in high-energy physics and related fields
 Clare Courier, newspaper based in Ballycasey, Shannon, County Clare, Ireland
 Courier du Bas-Rhin, published in the Prussian exclave of Kleve
 Dhaka Courier, a Bangladeshi English language weekly news-magazine

Technology
 Courier (typeface), a monospaced slab serif typeface or font
 Courier, a line of modems, manufactured by USRobotics
 Courier 1B, telecommunications satellite
 Courier (email client), email client used in Microsoft Windows
 Courier Mail Server, computer software
 Microsoft Courier, a prototype tablet computer from Microsoft

Transport

Aviation
 Airspeed Courier, a pre-World War 2, British, single engined light aircraft
 C-38 Courier, the US military designation for the Gulfstream G100
 Consolidated O-17 Courier, US National Guard biplane
 Helio Courier, a STOL, light aircraft
 Rans S-7 Courier, a modern, two–seat light aircraft

Maritime
 Hired armed cutter Courier, used by the Royal Navy, 1799–1806
 Ocean Courier, a Cameron-class steamship
 USCGC Courier, US Information Agency Cold War broadcasting ship
 USNS Courier (T-AK-5019), formerly SS Export Courier, US Reserve Fleet reserve ship
 USS Courier, three ships of the US Navy

Rail
 Courier, a GWR Iron Duke Class steam locomotive
 Courier, a GWR 3031 Class locomotive, 1892–1914

Road
 Sandusky Courier, made by Sandusky in Sandusky, Ohio, US, 1904–1905
 Courier Car Co, Daytom, Ohio, US, 1909
 Ford Courier, a light truck
 Triumph Courier, a small van based on the Triumph Herald (1962–1966)

Other uses
 Courier (1812 ship)
 Courier chess, a variant on the game of chess
 Courier (smuggling), someone who personally smuggles contraband across a border for a smuggling organization
 Courier City-Oscawana, a neighborhood within the city limits of Tampa, Florida, US
 Jim Courier (born 1970), American tennis player

See also

 قاصد (disambiguation)
 Courrier (disambiguation)
 Courier Mail (disambiguation)
 Bristol Courier (disambiguation)
 California Courier (disambiguation)
 The Daily Courier (disambiguation)
 
 
 Currier (disambiguation)